Ivo Žďárek (6 November 1960 – 20 September 2008) was a Czech diplomat. He died in the fire in the aftermath of the Islamabad Marriott Hotel bombing trying to rescue people from the burning building.

Early life
He studied at the Moscow State Institute of International Relations in Moscow, at the Charles University in Prague, at Stanford University, and the Czech Diplomatic Academy. He had a wife, Jana, and two children.

Diplomatic career
Žďárek worked at various diplomatic missions of the Czech Republic in Asia. He served as consul-general in Shanghai, People's Republic of China from 1995 to 1999. From 2004 to August 2008, he was the ambassador in Vietnam. He then became the ambassador to Pakistan.

Death
Žďárek survived the bombing of the Islamabad Marriott Hotel but went in to help other survivors get out of the burning building. He called with his mobile phone asking to be rescued but was unable to escape the blaze.
Žďárek's body was returned to his country. A ceremony paying homage to him was held at Prague's airport.
"We are all very saddened, we always appreciated the ambassador’s work considerably," Czech President Václav Klaus said.
The ceremony was also attended by Žďárek's family and Prime Minister Mirek Topolánek.

References

External links
 Curriculum Vitae of Ivo Žďárek - Embassy of the Czech Republic in Pakistan website
 https://web.archive.org/web/20080923011000/http://www.app.com.pk/en_/index.php?option=com_content&task=view&id=53574&Itemid=1

Ambassadors of the Czech Republic to Vietnam
Ambassadors of the Czech Republic to Pakistan
Charles University alumni
Stanford University alumni
Czech terrorism victims
Terrorism deaths in Pakistan
1960 births
2008 deaths